Line 7 of the Beijing Subway is a rapid transit line in Beijing. Like Line 6, Line 7 provides additional relief to the overcapacity Line 1 adding another east–west trunk line to the Beijing Subway network. The line uses 8-car Type B trains.

Stations
List of stations from west to east.

Planning
Line 6 was originally conceived in 1973 as a "pan-handle" shaped route incorporating the central sections of today's Lines 6 and 7. In 1983 Line 6 was dissolved into two distinct lines. The section under Guang'anmen, Luomashi, Zhushikou and Guangqumen Streets and the "handle" branch to Fengtai became Line 7. The rest of the loop with a new south eastern extension to what was at the time the Beijing Jiaohuachang (Coking Plant) complex became Line 6. Line 7 was later revised westward to terminate at a new major railway station called Beijing West railway station and Line 9 taking over servicing Fengtai. When Beijing West railway station started construction in the early 1990s space was set aside for a subway station allowing Cross-platform interchange for the future Lines 7 and 9. By 1993 the planned section of Line 6 heading to Jiaohuachang was revised as an eastern extension of Line 7, forming the alignment built today.

Line 7 was originally slated to have 15 stations, from the Beijing West railway station to Baiziwan.

In 2013, planners revised the design of Line 7 from using the standard 6 car trains to 8 car trains after performing a detailed transport study of the Fatou area. Fatou's population projections were upgraded from 100,000 to 220,000 people and be a significant employment hub in the future. Planners decided that 6 cars trains would have insufficient capacity for the new demand projections. Line 7 was originally planned to use 1500 V DC overhead lines to power the longer subway trains. However, the already completed platforms at Beijing West railway station assumed the line would use a 750 V DC 3rd rail system like Beijing's legacy subway lines and built with vertical clearance for such. The line ultimately used a 1500 V DC 3rd rail system as a compromise.

In 8 July 2022, an EIA document regarding Phase III construction of Beijing rail transport system (2022–2027) announced the Phase III of Line 7, from Beijing West Railway station to Wanshousi, it will be a 6.4 km long section with 4 new stations.

History

Phase 1
Construction began in January 2010. It started test runs in September 2014 with full operation beginning on December 28, 2014.

Eastern extension (Phase 2)
The eastern extension runs  through Chaoyang and Tongzhou Districts. The extension is fully underground. It was opened on December 28, 2019.  station opened on August 26, 2021.

Timeline
January 8, 2008: Plans for Line 7 reported in the media.  Construction scheduled to begin by the end of the year.
Oct. 30, 2008: Line 7 route plan with 23 stations receive regulatory approval.  Construction still scheduled to begin by end of the year.
July 19, 2009: Construction on Line 7 announced to begin in late August 2009.
Nov. 6, 2009: Commencement of Line 7 construction deferred to 2010.
Jan. 19, 2010: Construction reportedly begun along Guangqu Road near the easternmost section of the line.
Dec. 28, 2014: Operations of Phase I of Line 7 begin, except for Shuangjing station and Fatou station.
Dec. 30, 2018: An infill station of Phase I, Fatou station was opened.
Dec. 28, 2019: Operations of Phase II of Line 7 begin, except for Universal Resort station. An infill station of Phase I, Shuangjing station was opened.
Aug. 26, 2021: Extended to Universal Resort station.

Rolling Stock

References

External links 

Beijing Subway lines
Railway lines opened in 2014
2014 establishments in China
1500 V DC railway electrification